The Gas Light and Coke Company (also known as the Westminster Gas Light and Coke Company, and the Chartered Gas Light and Coke Company), was a company that made and supplied coal gas and coke. The headquarters of the company were located on Horseferry Road in Westminster, London. It is identified as the original company from which British Gas plc is descended.

History

The company was founded by Frederick Albert Winsor, who was originally from Germany, and incorporated by royal charter on 30 April 1812 under the seal of King George III. It was the first company set up to supply London with (coal) gas, and operated the first gas works in the United Kingdom which was also the world's first public gas works. It was governed by a "Court of Directors", which met for the first time on 24 June 1812. The original capitalisation was £200,000 divided into 4,000 shares.

Offices were established at Pall Mall, with a wharf at Cannon Row. In 1818 the company established a tar works in Poplar and expanded their works at Brick Lane and Westminster. Under the company's chief engineer, Samuel Clegg (formerly of Boulton and Watt), a gas works was installed at the Royal Mint in 1817 and by 1819 nearly 290 miles of pipes had been laid in London, supplying 51,000 burners. Clegg also developed a practical gas meter.

The company absorbed numerous smaller companies, including:

The GLCC's constituent companies had themselves absorbed smaller companies, including:

With the advent of electricity the company expanded into domestic services, with "lady demonstrators" employed to promote gas cooking. This home service eventually developed into a full advisory service on domestic gas use.

In 1948 the GLCC supplied an area of 547 square miles from Egham in Surrey, Pinner in North West London to Southend-on-Sea in Essex. It supplied a population of 4.5 million, and in 1948 had 21,250 employees and sold 276.7 million Therms of gas. On 1 May 1949 the GLCC was nationalised under the Gas Act 1948 and became the major part of the new North Thames Gas Board, one of Britain's twelve regional area gas boards.

The GLCC's service valve covers can still be seen on the streets of London, dating from the period of its operation.

Gasworks
The following thirteen gasworks were in operation when the GLCC was dissolved in 1949.

Beckton
Beckton Gas Works were built in 1868 on East Ham Levels east of London. The site was named "Beckton" after the GLCC chairman, Simon Adams Beck. The vast  not only gave the GLCC room for much more gas production than at Nine Elms, but was downriver of the Pool of London and so could be served by significantly larger colliers.

In 1872 five men were gaoled for 12 months following a strike at the Beckton works in support of two workers sacked for requesting a pay rise. The sentence was subsequently reduced to four months. In 1889 men were laid off from Beckton, prompting the founding of the National Union of Gasworkers and General Labourers, which subsequently became part of the General, Municipal, Boilermakers and Allied Trades Union (GMB Union). Engineer to the St Pancras works in 1903, and the Shoreditch works in 1905, and in 1906 he was appointed Resident Engineer of the Beckton works of the Gas Light and Coke Co. The Resident Engineer from 1906 was Joseph Newell Reeson who went on to undertake world first experiments with welded gas holder construction. 

At the time of nationalisation in 1949, Beckton was the largest gas works in the world, capable of producing a total of 119.12 million cubic feet of gas per day (3.37 million m3/day). The works subsequently closed in 1976.

Bow Common 
Bow Common gasworks was built by the Great Central Gas Consumers' Company in 1850 (Messrs. Peto and Betts had contracted to build the works for £106,000) the works was remote from its supply area in the City and the East End. By the late 1850s the works had fallen into "ruinous disrepair". The Great Central was absorbed by the GLCC in 1870. The Bow Common works was entirely rebuilt by the GLCC in the early 1930s. Productive capacity was 10.5 million cubic feet per day in 1948.

Brentford 
The Brentford Gas Company was established in 1820, its gasworks at Brentford was therefore one of the oldest in the country. The company grew to supply Acton, Ealing, Hanwell, Southall, Heston, Twickenham and Barnes. It received legal powers in 1868 to build a new works at Southall on the Grand Union Canal as the Brentford site was said to be too cramped for development. Nevertheless, the Brentford site remained in use and was redesigned and rebuilt in 1935 with Intermittent Vertical Retorts after a study of the Pintsch-Otto plant in Germany; and a polygonal MAN waterless gasometer was built. Productive capacity was 15.5 million cubic feet per day in 1948.

Bromley 
The Imperial Gas Light and Coke Company spent £300,000 on the works on Bow Creek at Bromley-by-Bow which was "obsolescent in design and not yet in sight of completion" in 1875. The company was amalgamated with the GLCC in 1876 but the Bromley works was still considered to be a "vast white elephant" because the coaling arrangements on Bow Creek were unsatisfactory. The plant was reconstructed in the 1890s. Productive capacity was 30.65 million cubic feet per day in 1948. The site subsequently closed in 1976, however the Bromley-by-Bow gasholders remain as they were heritage listed in 1984.

Fulham 

The Imperial Gas Company started construction of its works at Sands End in Fulham in 1824. Its ornately decorated number 2 gasholder is Georgian, completed in 1830 and reputed to be the oldest gasholder in the World. The Imperial Gasworks' neoclassical office building was completed in 1857 and a laboratory designed by the architect Sir Walter Tapper was added in 1927. All three structures are now Grade II listed buildings.

Coal was delivered by flatiron coastal colliers, which had a low-profile superstructure, hinged funnel and masts in order to pass under bridges upriver from the Pool of London. The GLCC had a new jetty built at Imperial Wharf in the 1920s. Productive capacity was 32.5 million cubic feet per day in 1948.

Harrow and Stanmore 
The Harrow and Stanmore Gas Company operated the works at Harrow and Stanmore until the company was absorbed by the GLCC in 1924. The Stanmore gas works were located at the north side of the marsh on Marsh Lane. A waterless gasometer was installed in 1931, amidst an outcry about ruining the view from Harrow Hill, including from the headmaster of Harrow School. The holder was painted in undulating lines of green, lighter in tone as they went up the holder. Productive capacity of the works was 3.28 million cubic feet per day in 1948. The gasometer was demolished in 1986.

Kensal Green 
Kensal Green gasworks was built by the Western Gas Light Company soon its incorporation in 1844. It supplied Cannel gas to St Pancras, St Marylebone, Bloomsbury, Hampstead, Paddington and Chelsea. Cannel gas was more expensive to produce but gave a better light than coal gas; however, the works were converted to produce coal gas in 1886. The Western company was absorbed by the GLCC in 1873. In 1889 inclined retorts were installed. The Kensal Green works were entirely rebuilt by the GLCC in the early 1930s. Productive capacity was 16.3 million cubic feet per day in 1948. In 1954 the new No.3 retort house was opened.

Nine Elms 
Nine Elms Gas Works were built in 1858 by the London Gas Light Company, on the site of a former tidal mill on the south bank of the River Thames. The company was taken over by the GLCC in 1883. The works covered  and once employed 800 people. There was a major explosion at the works on 31 October 1865: eleven workers were killed and destroyed the northern gasometer (1.04 million cubic feet). The works were damaged in Second World War air raids.

Coal was delivered by flatiron coastal colliers. After the works were rebuilt, a new jetty and coal handling plant were added in 1952. Productive capacity was 27.7 million cubic feet per day in 1948.

Nine Elms Gas Works closed in 1970 as a result of Britain's conversion to natural gas from the North Sea. The site has since been redeveloped for a Royal Mail depot and other commercial units.

Shoreditch 
The gasworks at Shoreditch was another venture by the Imperial Gas Light and Coke Company, constructed adjacent to the Regents Canal in 1822. By the 1840s the works supplied gas to Tottenham and Edmonton. Shoreditch gasworks became part of the GLCC in 1876. In 1934 Shoreditch became a stand-by station for "use only in times of exceptional demand". Productive capacity was 5.75 million cubic feet per day in 1948.

Southall 
Southall Gas Works was completed in 1869 for the Brentford Gas Company. The GLCC took the company over in 1926 and had Southall's No. 5 gas holder built early in the 1930s.

Coal was supplied to Southall works via the Grand Union Canal and the Great Western Railway. Like Beckton, Southall was a major supplier of road tar. Productive capacity was 20.25 million cubic feet per day in 1948.

Southend-on-Sea 
The Southend-on-Sea and District Gas Company was established in 1854 and a gasworks was built to the east of the pier. The company absorbed the undertakings at Rochford (1920) and Leigh-on-Sea (1923), and was in turn absorbed by the GLCC in 1932. By this time the plant at Southend was obsolete and the works was entirely rebuilt. Coal was supplied to a dedicated pier. Productive capacity was 7.75 million cubic feet per day in 1948.

Staines 
The Staines gasworks were originally built by the Staines and Egham District Gas and Coke Company on a site adjacent to the River Thames – although coal was delivered by road. The company was absorbed by the Brentford Company in 1915, which was itself absorbed by the GLCC in 1926. Although the works at Staines was considered to be small it was kept as it was able to meet local requirements at an extremity of the GLCC's grid. A polygonal MAN waterless gasometer was installed in the 1930s. Productive capacity was 1.3 million cubic feet per day in 1948. A continuous catalytic reforming plant was in operation from 1966 to 1971.

Stratford 
The gasworks at Stratford was built by the West Ham Gas Company. It supplied a densely populated area east of London and provided a bulk gas supply to the Chigwell, Loughton and Woodford Gas Company. It was absorbed by the GLCC in 1912. Productive capacity was 9.0 million cubic feet per day in 1948.

Closed gasworks 
The gasworks of the GLCC and its constituent companies that were closed before 1948 (date of closure) were as follows.

Transport

The company had a large and diverse transport fleet including ships, barges and railway wagons and locomotives to bring coal into the gasworks and take coke and by-products out, plus horse-drawn and later motorised transport for local delivery and maintenance.

Ships
Stephenson Clarke and Associated Companies managed the GLCC's ships.

GLCC ships had brown upper works above hull level. The funnel was black with a broad silver band above two narrow silver or white bands, and the broad silver band was emblazoned with red pyramids. The house flag was white with a red rising sun in the centre and the initials "G L C Co." in blue capitals distributed around the four corners.

SS Lanterna was a 1,685 GRT collier built in 1882 by the Tyne Iron Shipbuilding Co. of Willington Quay, Howdon, Tyneside. On 6 October 1916 a mine sank her in the North Sea off Cromer. All her crew survived.

SS Coalgas was a 2,257 GRT collier built in 1890 by Short Brothers at Pallion, Sunderland. On 5 March 1918 a mine sank her in the North Sea southeast of Orford Ness. All her crew survived.

SS Ignis was a 2,042 GRT collier built in 1903 by Bonn and Mees of Rotterdam. On 8 December 1915 a mine sank her in the North Sea off Aldeburgh. All her crew survived.

SS Fulgens was a 2,512 GRT collier built in 1912 by Wood, Skinner & Co of Newcastle upon Tyne. On 1 August 1915 the German submarine  torpedoed and sank her in the North Sea one mile off Sea Palling. All her crew survived.

SS Snilesworth was a 2,220 GRT collier that Short Brothers had built in 1889 for John Tulley and Sons of Sunderland. The GLCC bought her in 1915 and renamed her Lampada. On 8 December 1917 the German Type UB III submarine  torpedoed and sank her in the North Sea three miles north of Whitby. Five of Lampadas crew were killed.

SS Grovemont was a 1,298 GRT collier built as Tudhoe in 1906 by S.P. Austin and Son of Sunderland for Furness Withy. J.P. Jönsson of Landskrona, Sweden bought her in 1913 and renamed her Grovemont. The GLCC bought her in 1915 and renamed her Capitol (I). In 1925 the GLCC sold her to new owners in Norway who renamed her Vilma. After the Second World War she passed through three more owners and names. She was broken up in Hamburg in 1957.SS Grovelea was a 1,282 GRT collier built in 1906 as Lady Furness for A. Christiansen of Copenhagen. J.P. Jönsson bought her in 1912 and renamed her Grovelea. The GLCC bought her in 1915 and renamed her Phare. On 31 October 1917 the German submarine  torpedoed and sank her in the North Sea off Scarborough. 14 of Phares 18 crew were killed.

SS Universal was a 1,274 GRT collier built in 1878 by Short Brothers for the Taylor and Sanderson Steam Ship Co of Sunderland. The GLCC bought her in 1916 and renamed her Ardens. On 18 August 1917 the German submarine  torpedoed and sank her in the North Sea off Filey. One of Ardens crew was killed.

SS Magnus Mail was a 2,299 GRT cargo ship built in 1889 by Short Brothers for J. Westoll of Sunderland. The GLCC bought her in 1916 and renamed her . On 21 May 1917 the German submarine  shelled and boarded her in the North Sea off Whitby. The boarding party tried to scuttle her with explosives but she did not immediately sink. Vessels from Whitby rescued her crew and took Lanthorn in tow, but she sank before she could be beached.

SS Rookwood was a 1,143 GRT collier built in 1896 by John Blumer & Co. of Sunderland for the East London Steam Ship Co of London. The GLCC bought her in 1916 and renamed her Firelight. On 1 May 1917 the German submarine  torpedoed and sank Firelight off the mouth of the River Tyne.

SS Monkwood was a 1,141 GRT collier built in 1900 by John Blumer & Co. for Steam Colliers Ltd. of London. She was sold to Tyne & Wear Shipping in 1901. The GLCC bought her in 1916 and renamed her Glow. On 22 July 1917 the German submarine  torpedoed and sank her in the North Sea off Cloughton. One of Glows gunners was killed.

SS War Brigade was a 2,365 GRT coaster ordered by the UK War Shipping Controller and built in 1919. While she was under construction the GLCC bought her and renamed her Halo. On 21 March 1941 a mine in the Thames sank her off Beckton Pier. She was later salvaged and returned to service. On 22 January 1945 a German E-boat torpedoed her in the North Sea off Vlissingen. She was taken in tow but sank the next day. All her crew were saved.

SS Whitemantle was a 1,692 GRT collier built in 1920 by Wood, Skinner & Co of Newcastle upon Tyne. On 22 October 1939 she was sunk in the North Sea by a mine off Withernsea.

SS Flashlight was a 934 GRT flatiron launched in May 1920 by S.P. Austin & Son of Sunderland. Enemy aircraft bombed and sank her off The Wash on 7 March 1941.

SS Gaslight was a coastal collier launched in 1920. The GLCC bought her in 1921 to supply Beckton gas works and Regents Canal Dock. She passed to North Thames Gas Board upon nationalisation in 1949.

SS Fireglow (I) was a 1,261 GRT flatiron built in 1925 by S.P. Austin & Son. On 8 December 1941 a German mine in the Hearty Knoll Channel in the North Sea north of Blakeney Point sank her, killing one of her crew.

SS Homefire was a 1,262 GRT flatiron built in 1925 by S.P. Austin & Son.

SS Lady Olga was a 1,266 GRT flatiron built in 1927 by S.P. Austin & Son to serve Fulham Gasworks. She passed to North Thames Gas Board upon nationalisation in 1949 and was broken up at Hoboken, Antwerp in 1958.

MV Barking is a tug built in 1928 by J. Pollock & Sons of Faversham, Kent. Her work was to move lighters on the Thames. She has survived, is preserved in private ownership and has been re-engined as a steam tug.

SS Suntrap was a 939 GRT flatiron built in 1929 by Hawthorn Leslie and Company of Hebburn on Tyneside. On nationalisation in 1949 she passed to North Thames Gas Board, who in 1954 sold her to the Ouse Steam Ship Company, who renamed her Sunfleet.

SS Torchbearer was a 1,267 GRT collier built in 1929 by John Crown & Sons Ltd of Sunderland. On 19 November 1939 she was sunk by a mine in the North Sea off Orford Ness and four of her crew were killed.

SS Horseferry was a 951 GRT collier built in 1930 by John Crown & Sons. On 11 March 1942 the German E-boat S-27 torpedoed and sank her in the North Sea off Winterton-on-Sea. 11 members of her crew were killed.

SS Mr. Therm was a 2,974 GRT collier launched in April 1936 by S.P. Austin & Son. She was named after an advertising image that the illustrator Eric Fraser (1902–83) had designed for the GLCC in 1931.

SS Icemaid was a 1,964 GRT collier launched in May 1936 by S.P. Austin & Son. On nationalisation in 1949 she passed to North Thames Gas Board, who in 1958 sold her to Greek owners who renamed her Papeira M and registered her in Panama. She was wrecked at Mogadishu, Somalia in 1963 and scrapped at Split, Yugoslavia in 1965.

 was a 2,972 GRT collier launched in September 1936 by S.P. Austin & Son. On 17 October 1940 the E-boat S-27 torpedoed her in the North Sea off Smith's Knoll east of Great Yarmouth. Gasfires stern was damaged and 11 crew were killed but she remained afloat. Austin rebuilt her stern (increasing her GRT to 3,001) and in May 1941 she returned to service, but on 21 June 1941 a mine sank her in the North Sea 11 miles east of Southwold.

SS Murdoch was a 2,717 GRT collier launched in January 1941 by S.P. Austin & Son. On 26 April 1941 she struck a submerged wreck in the North Sea, causing a severe leak. Her crew tried to keep her under way, but she sank near the North Scroby Sand off Caister-on-Sea.

SS Capitol (II) was a 1,558 GRT flatiron launched in April 1941 by S.P. Austin & Son.

SS Adams Beck was a 2,816 GRT collier built in 1941 by the Burntisland Shipbuilding Company of Fife. She was launched in April 1941 and completed in June, but on 29 July enemy aircraft attacked and sank her in the Tyne estuary, killing one member of the crew.

SS Fireside was a 2,717 GRT collier launched in March 1942 by S.P. Austin & Son.

SS Flamma was a 2,727 GRT collier launched at Burntisland in April 1942. She passed to North Thames Gas Board upon nationalisation in 1949. In 1963 she was sold to new owners who renamed her Sangeorge and registered her in Panama. In 1967 she was broken up in Bremen, Germany.

SS Firedog was a 1,557 GRT flatiron launched for the GLCC in July 1942 by S.P. Austin & Son.

SS Winsor was a 2,831 GRT collier launched at Burntisland in May 1942. She passed to North Thames Gas Board upon nationalisation in 1949. In 1964 she was sold to new owners who renamed her Ypapanti and registered her in Panama. In 1966 she was wrecked in the North Sea off Walton on the Naze.

SS Firelight (II) was a 2,841 GRT collier launched at Burntisland in January 1943 and completed in May. On 4 November 1943 an E-boat torpedoed her in the North Sea off the coast of Norfolk. The torpedo blew off Firelights bow but she remained afloat and put into Great Yarmouth the next day. Later she was taken to South Shields, fitted with a new bow section and returned to service.

SS Fireglow (II) was a 1,549 GRT flatiron launched in July 1944 by S.P. Austin & Son. She took the name of the earlier Fireglow sunk in 1941.

SS Firebeam was a 1,554 GRT collier launched in 1945 by Hall, Russell & Company of Aberdeen, who built her under contract to Burntisland Shipbuilding.

MV Adams Beck was a 1,773 GRT flatiron launched at Burntisland in 1948. She took the name of the earlier Adams Beck sunk in 1941. She passed to North Thames Gas Board upon nationalisation in 1949. She was sold to Greek owners in 1963 who renamed her Razani and registered her in Panama. In 1967 she ran aground in Galway Bay in Ireland. In 1968 she was refloated, taken to Passage West near Cork and broken up.

References

Sources and further reading

External links
 

Industrial history of the United Kingdom
Oil and gas companies of the United Kingdom
Defunct shipping companies of the United Kingdom
Companies based in the City of Westminster
Defunct energy companies of the United Kingdom
1812 establishments in England
British companies established in 1812
Energy companies established in 1812
History of the City of Westminster
History of the London Borough of Hammersmith and Fulham
Buildings and structures in the London Borough of Hammersmith and Fulham
Former buildings and structures in the London Borough of Hammersmith and Fulham